The Brady Bunch is an American sitcom created by Sherwood Schwartz that aired from September 26, 1969, to March 8, 1974, on ABC. The series revolves around a large blended family with six children. The show aired for five seasons and, after its cancellation in 1974, went into syndication in September 1975. Though it was never a ratings hit or a critical success during its original run, the program has since become a popular syndicated staple, especially among children and teenage viewers.

The Brady Bunchs success in syndication led to several television reunion films and spin-off series: The Brady Bunch Hour (1976–77), The Brady Girls Get Married (1981), The Brady Brides (1981), A Very Brady Christmas (1988), and The Bradys (1990). In 1995, the series was adapted into a satirical comedy theatrical film titled The Brady Bunch Movie, followed by A Very Brady Sequel in 1996. A second sequel, The Brady Bunch in the White House, aired on Fox in November 2002 as a made-for-television film.

In 1997, "Getting Davy Jones" (season three, episode 12) was ranked number 37 on TV Guides 100 Greatest Episodes of All-Time. The show's enduring popularity has resulted in its widespread recognition as an American cultural icon.

Premise
Mike Brady (Robert Reed), a widowed architect with three sons—Greg (Barry Williams), Peter (Christopher Knight), and Bobby (Mike Lookinland)—marries Carol Martin (Florence Henderson), who herself has three daughters: Marcia (Maureen McCormick), Jan (Eve Plumb), and Cindy (Susan Olsen). Carol and her daughters take the Brady surname. Included in the blended family are Mike's live-in housekeeper, Alice Nelson (Ann B. Davis), and the boys' dog, Tiger. (In the pilot episode, the girls also have a pet: a cat named Fluffy. Fluffy never appears in any other episodes.) The setting is a large two-story house designed by Mike, located in a Los Angeles suburb.  The show never addressed what happened to Carol's first husband.

In the first season, awkward adjustments, accommodations, gender rivalries, and resentments inherent in blended families dominate the storylines. In an early episode, Carol tells Bobby that the only "steps" in their household lead to the second floor (in other words, that the Bradys are not a "stepfamily", only "a family"). Thereafter, episodes focus on typical teen and preteen concerns such as sibling rivalry, puppy love, self-image, character building, responsibility, dating, school grades and getting along in social company. Noticeably absent is any political commentary, especially regarding the Vietnam War, which was being waged at its largest extent during the height of the series.

Episodes

Cast and characters

Main
The regular cast appears in an opening title sequence in which video "headshots" are arranged in a three-by-three grid, with cast members appearing to look around at one another. The sequence used the then-new "multi-dynamic image technique" created by Canadian filmmaker Christopher Chapman; as a result of the popular attention it garnered in this sequence, it was referred to in the press as "the Brady Bunch effect". In a 2010 issue of TV Guide, the show's opening title sequence ranked number eight on a list of TV's top-10 credits sequences, as selected by readers.

 Robert Reed as Mike Brady
 Florence Henderson as Carol Brady
 Ann B. Davis as Alice Nelson
 Maureen McCormick as Marcia Brady
 Eve Plumb as Jan Brady
 Susan Olsen as Cindy Brady
 Barry Williams as Greg Brady
 Christopher Knight as Peter Brady
 Mike Lookinland as Bobby Brady

Recurring characters
 Sam Franklin (Allan Melvin) is Alice's boyfriend. He is the owner of a local butcher shop. Sam appears in only eight episodes, but they span all five seasons. He is also frequently mentioned in dialogue, and Alice occasionally goes on dates with him off-screen. By the time of the 1981 made-for-TV movie The Brady Girls Get Married, Alice and Sam are married.
 Tiger the dog – the original dog that played Tiger died early in the first season. A replacement dog proved problematic, so the producers decided the dog would appear only when essential to the plot. Tiger appeared in about half the episodes in the first season and about half a dozen episodes in the second season. Tiger seemingly vanished without an explanation and was not shown again after "The Impractical Joker" (last episode shown with Tiger) and "What Goes Up" (last episode made with Tiger); however, his kennel remained in the back yard for the entire run of the series.
 Mr. Phillips (Jack Collins) is Mike's boss at the architectural firm. He appears in only three episodes, but is often mentioned in other episodes when work-related issues occur.
 Cousin Oliver (Robbie Rist) – in the middle of season five, producers added a new character named Oliver, Carol Brady's young nephew, who is sent to live with the Bradys while his parents are living in South America. The character was added in an attempt to fill the age gap left by the maturing Brady children—the youngest (Susan Olsen) was 12 years old during the show's final season. Lloyd Schwartz, son of creator and executive producer Sherwood Schwartz, later admitted that the character threw off the balance of the show and said that fans regarded the character as an interloper. Oliver appears in the final six episodes of season five, which proved to be the final season, as ABC cancelled the series in 1974. The addition of the character has been cited as the moment the series "jumped the shark". The term "Cousin Oliver" has been used to describe the addition of a young character as an attempt to save a series from cancellation.

Notable guest stars
 Herbert Anderson as a doctor who comes to treat the boys' measles in "Is There a Doctor in the House?" (season one).
 Melissa Sue Anderson played Millicent, a girl who gives Bobby his first kiss ("Never Too Young", season five).
 Desi Arnaz Jr. meets Marcia, who wrote about him in her diary in "The Possible Dream" (season one).
 Jim Backus appears three times in the series, twice in two of the three Grand Canyon episodes, "Ghost Town U.S.A." and "Grand Canyon or Bust", playing Zaccariah T. Brown, who mistakenly thinks the Bradys are jumping his gold claim and locks them in a ghost-town jail; and in "The Hustler" (season five) playing Mike's second boss, Mr. Harry Matthews.
 Ken Berry played Ken Kelly, the Bradys' new neighbor who is the adoptive father of three diverse boys (black, white, and Asian) in the season five episode "Kelly's Kids". Sherwood Schwartz was attempting to sell a spin-off series called Kelly's Kids featuring Berry, but the show idea failed to interest ABC.
 Imogene Coca plays the Brady girls' great-aunt Jenny, whom Jan fears she will grow up to resemble after seeing a childhood photo of her in "Jan's Aunt Jenny" (season three).
 Don Drysdale tries to inject reality into Greg's dreams of being a professional baseball player in "The Dropout" (season two).
 Don Ho meets Cindy and Bobby and serenades Cindy in Honolulu in "Hawaii Bound" (part one of a three-part season-four episode), filmed on location in Hawaii.
 Davy Jones (of The Monkees) performs at a music studio and then takes Marcia to her school dance in "Getting Davy Jones" (season three). Decades later, Jones satirized his cameo in The Brady Bunch Movie.
 Deacon Jones encourages Peter's singing in "The Drummer Boy" (season two).
 Bart La Rue plays a football coach in "The Drummer Boy" (season two) and "Click" (season three).
 E. G. Marshall is J.P. Randolph, Marcia's school principal, in "The Slumber Caper" (season two).
 Brigadier General James McDivitt (NASA astronaut) signs autographs for Peter and Bobby after appearing on a talk show in "Out of This World" (season five).
 Joe Namath visits Bobby after Cindy contacts him saying Bobby has a terminal illness in "Mail Order Hero" (season five).
 Denise Nickerson as Pamela Phillips, niece of Mike Brady's boss, Ed Phillips, whom Peter dates at Mike's request in "Two Petes in a Pod" (season five).
 Wes Parker meets Mike and Greg in Greg's math classroom, thus curing Greg of the crush he had on his teacher Miss Linda O'Hara (played by Gigi Perreau), Parker's fiancée in "The Undergraduate" (season one).
 Vincent Price appears twice in the series in two of the three Hawaii episodes, "Pass the Tabu", and "The Tiki Caves" from season four, playing the villainous Professor Hubert Whitehead, who holds the Brady boys hostage.
 Marion Ross appears as a doctor who comes to treat the girls' measles in "Is There a Doctor in the House?" (season one).
 Natalie Schafer is Mike's fussy client, Penelope Fletcher, who is charmed by Cindy's impromptu 'Shirley Temple' routine in "The Snooperstar" (season five).
 Marcia Wallace plays a salesclerk in "Would the Real Jan Brady Please Stand Up" (season two) and Mrs. Robbins in "Getting Davy Jones" (season three).
 Rita Wilson began her career with a guest appearance in "Greg's Triangle" (season four) where she plays one of the candidates running against Marcia for head cheerleader.
 Paul Winchell appears as Skip Farnum, the TV commercial director in "And Now a Word From Our Sponsor" (season three).

Production

Development
In 1966, following the success of his TV series Gilligan's Island, Sherwood Schwartz conceived the idea for The Brady Bunch after reading in the Los Angeles Times that "30% of marriages [in the United States] have a child or children from a previous marriage". He set to work on a pilot script for a series tentatively titled Mine and Yours. Schwartz then developed the script to include three children for each parent. While Mike Brady is depicted as being a widower, Schwartz originally wanted the character of Carol Brady to have been a divorcée, but the network objected to this. A compromise was reached whereby Carol's marital status (whether she was divorced or widowed) was never directly revealed.

Schwartz shopped the series to the "big three" television networks of the era. ABC, CBS, and NBC all liked the script, but each network wanted changes before they would commit to filming, so Schwartz shelved the project. Although similarities exist between the series and two 1968 theatrical release films, United Artists' Yours, Mine and Ours (starring Henry Fonda and Lucille Ball) and CBS's With Six You Get Eggroll (starring Brian Keith and Doris Day), the original script for The Brady Bunch predated the scripts for both of these films. Nonetheless, the outstanding success of Yours, Mine and Ours (the 11th-highest-grossing film of 1968) was a factor in ABC's decision to order episodes for the series.

After receiving a commitment for 13 weeks of television shows from ABC in 1968, Schwartz hired film and television director John Rich to direct the pilot, then called "The Brady Brood", cast the six children from 264 interviews during that summer, and hired the actors to play the mother, father, and housekeeper roles. For the part of the father, Schwartz originally cast Bob Holiday, who was well-known for portraying Superman in a Broadway musical, but since Holiday had little on-camera experience, network executives overrode Schwartz's decision and gave the role to TV veteran Robert Reed. As the sets were built on Paramount Television stage 5, adjacent to the stage where H.R. Pufnstuf was filmed by Sid and Marty Krofft, who later produced The Brady Bunch Hour, the production crew prepared the backyard of a home in Sherman Oaks, Los Angeles, as the exterior location for the chaotic backyard wedding scene. Filming of the pilot began on Friday, October 4, 1968, and lasted eight days.

Theme song and credits sequence
The theme song, written by Schwartz and Frank De Vol, and originally arranged, sung, and performed by Paul Parrish, Lois Fletcher, and John Beland under the name the Peppermint Trolley Company, quickly communicated to audiences that the Bradys were a blended family. As described above, the Brady family is shown in a three-by-three grid, tic-tac-toe board-style graphic with Carol in the top center, Alice in the middle block, and Mike in the bottom center. To the right are three blocks with the boys from the oldest on top to the youngest. To the left are three blocks with the girls from the oldest to the youngest. In season two, the Brady kids took over singing the theme song. In season three, the boys sing the first verse, girls sing the second verse, and all sing together for the third and last verse. In season four, a new version is recorded with the same structure as the season three version, but in season five, the season three version returns. Utilizing Christopher Chapman's "multi-dynamic image technique", a version of which had famously appeared in the 1968 film The Thomas Crown Affair, the sequence was created and filmed by Howard A. Anderson Jr., a visual effects pioneer who worked on the title sequences for many popular television series. The use of this innovation here became so familiar through the sitcom's popularity that it was referred to in the press as the "Brady Bunch effect". 

The end credits feature an instrumental version of the theme song's third verse. In season one, it was recorded by the Peppermint Trolley Company. From season two on, the theme was recorded in-house by Paramount musicians.

The Brady house
The house, built in 1959 and used in exterior shots, originally bore little relation to the interior layout (until 2018, when the interior of the house was rebuilt to match the soundstage sets) of the Bradys' on-screen home, is located in Studio City, within the city limits of Los Angeles.  According to a 1994 article in the Los Angeles Times, the San Fernando Valley house was built in 1959 and selected as the Brady residence because series creator Schwartz felt it looked like a home where an architect would live. A false window was attached to the front's A-frame section to give the illusion that it had two full stories (the 2018/19 renovation installed a real window where the false one was in the TV show footage). Contemporary establishing shots of the house were filmed with the owner's permission for the 1990 TV series The Bradys. The owner refused to allow Paramount to restore the property to its 1969 look for The Brady Bunch Movie in 1995, so a facade resembling the original home was built around an existing house.

The house was put up for sale, for the first time since 1973, in the summer of 2018 with an asking price of $1.885 million. Cable network HGTV outbid seven others for it, including NSYNC's Lance Bass. HGTV has expanded the home for its original series A Very Brady Renovation, with the goal of recreating each of the interior rooms used in the TV series (which had only existed as a Paramount Studios set) while maintaining the original exterior look from the street, and to make it fully habitable (unlike the sets made on Paramount soundstage #5). The six actors who played the TV children, and who also actively participated in the 2018/19 renovation, posed for a photo in front on November 1 the same year. 

In the series, the address of the house was given as 4222 Clinton Way (as read aloud by Carol from an arriving package in the first-season episode entitled "Lost Locket, Found Locket", and "Clinton Way" is clearly legible on Marcia's driver permit in the fifth-season episode "The Driver's Seat"). Although no city was ever specified, it was presumed from references to the Los Angeles Dodgers, the Los Angeles Rams, and a Hollywood movie studio, among many others, that the Bradys lived in Southern California, most likely Los Angeles or one of its suburbs.

The interior sets of the Brady house were used at least three times for other Paramount TV shows while The Brady Bunch was still in production: twice for Mannix and once for Mission: Impossible. In the case of Mission: Impossible, the Brady furniture was also used. A re-creation of the Brady house was constructed for the X-Files episode "Sunshine Days", which also revolved around The Brady Bunch.

Broadcast and syndication
Since its first syndicated airing in September 1975, an episode of the show has been broadcast somewhere in the United States and abroad every day of the year. Episodes were also shown on ABC Daytime from July 9, 1973, to April 18, 1975, and from June 30 to August 29, 1975, at 11:30 a.m. EST/10:30 CST.

The show aired on TBS starting in the 1980s until 1997, Nick at Nite in 1995 (for a special event), and again from 1998 to 2003 (and briefly during the spring of 2012), The N from March to April 2004, on TV Land on and off from 2002 to 2015, Nick Jr. (as part of the NickMom block from 2012 to 2013), and Hallmark Channel from January to June 2013 and again starting September 5-30, 2016.

Current airings
Since its national launch in 2010, the Weigel Broadcasting-owned classic-TV network MeTV has aired - except for occasional brief hiatuses - a weekly block of the show every Sunday early afternoon promoted as the "Brady Bunch Brunch". Beginning March 2023, Decades — a MeTV sister network to be rechristened as Catchy Comedy — will also air the show weekday mornings.

The Brady Bunch is also available through video-on-demand services Hulu and Paramount+, although neither streamer offers the complete collection of episodes in its entirety.

In (West) Germany, the show premiered on ZDF under the name Drei Mädchen und drei Jungen ("Three Girls and Three Boys") on August 8, 1971, with episode six "A Clubhouse Is Not A Home", and was shown on Sunday afternoons until halfway through Season 4, culminating with episode 77 "Cyrano De Brady" on October 5, 1974. Some episodes were omitted. From 1984 to 1998, reruns would sporadically occur on Sat.1. The later reunion show, "The Brady Girls Get Married/The Brady Brides" would be broadcast on ZDF as Eine Reizende Familie ("A Lovely Family") from October 18, 1984 to January 10, 1985. The second half of Season 4, Season 5 and the omitted episodes would not premiere before 1997 on Comedy & Co.

In Italy, the show aired on Canale 5 under the name La famiglia Brady (The Brady Family) in March 1987.

ITV broadcast the show in a number of United Kingdom regions, including Thames, Granada, Tyne Tees, Grampian and Ulster from 1975 to 1982; it later appeared on Sky One. The series was never a big hit in Britain.

Home media
Paramount Home Entertainment released all five seasons on DVD in Region 1 from 2005 to 2006, before CBS Home Entertainment took over DVD rights to the Paramount Television library (though CBS DVD releases are still distributed by Paramount). Paramount/CBS has released the series on DVD in other countries as well.

In April 2007, CBS Home Entertainment and Paramount Home Entertainment released the complete series box set, which includes the TV movies A Very Brady Christmas and "The Brady 500" (an episode of The Bradys), as well as two episodes of The Brady Kids animated series. The box art for this set features green shag carpeting and 1970s-style wood paneling.

8 years later on April 7, 2015, CBS Home Entertainment and Paramount Home Entertainment re-released the complete series box set, a repackaged version at a lower price, but it does not include the bonus disc that was part of the original complete series release.

The TV movie A Very Brady Christmas was released as a stand-alone DVD in Region 1 on October 10, 2017.

In conjunction with the 50th anniversary of the original series, CBS/Paramount released The Brady-est Brady Bunch TV & Movie Collection in Region 1 on June 4, 2019. The collection contains every episode of The Brady Bunch, The Brady Kids, The Brady Brides, and The Bradys, as well as the movies A Very Brady Christmas, The Brady Bunch Movie, A Very Brady Sequel, The Brady Bunch in the White House, and Growing Up Brady.

The first two seasons are also available on Region 2 DVD for the UK, with audio in English and subtitle choices in Norwegian, Swedish, Danish, or Finnish.

The series has also been released on VHS.

Reception

U.S. television ratings

Ratings data prior to 1972 is scarce for shows that did not place in the Top 30. Beginning in 2017, The TV Ratings Guide began publishing vintage television ratings as they became readily available from old newspaper publishings. Season 4 ratings came from Variety year-end rankings dated May 30, 1973. The Brady Bunch earned steady ratings during its primetime run (but never placed in the top 30 during the five years it aired) and was cancelled in 1974 after five seasons and 117 episodes; it was cancelled shortly after the series crossed the minimum threshold for syndication. At that point in the storyline, Greg graduated from high school and was about to enroll in college.

Awards and honors

The Brady Bunch was not an award-winning show at the time of its original broadcast in the 1970s. The series and its cast and crew were not nominated for an award until 1989, when Barry Williams was honored with the Former Child Star Lifetime Achievement Award at the 10th Youth in Film Awards.

All other awards and nominations for the series have come from the TV Land Awards:

Discography
During the series' original run, the six Brady kids recorded several albums on Paramount's record label, all credited to "The Brady Bunch". Note that Florence Henderson and Robert Reed did not participate in these recordings, and are not pictured on the album sleeves. 

While session musicians provided backing, the actors from the series provided their own singing voices (which was not always the case for early 1970s television crossover acts). In addition, Chris Knight & Maureen McCormick issued a duet LP in 1973, and five of the six Brady kids also released solo singles between 1970 and 1974; only Susan Olsen did not. None of the singles from The Brady Bunch, or any single or album from the assorted spin-off acts, ever became hits on any national music charts. The group's 1972 album Meet The Brady Bunch was their only charting release, hitting #108 on Billboard's album charts.

Studio albums

Compilation albums

Singles
Also includes solo singles as indicated.

Spin-offs, sequels, and reunions
Several spin-offs and sequels and reality series, to the original series have been made, featuring all or most of the original cast. These include another sitcom, an animated series, a variety show, television movies, a dramatic series, a stage play, theatrical movies, and a reality series.

Kelly's Kids
A final-season Brady Bunch episode, "Kelly's Kids", was intended as a pilot for a prospective spin-off series of the same name. Ken Berry starred as Ken Kelly, a friend and neighbor of the Bradys, who with his wife Kathy (Brooke Bundy) adopted three orphaned boys of different racial backgrounds. One of the adopted sons was played by Todd Lookinland, the younger brother of Mike Lookinland. While Kelly's Kids was not subsequently picked up as a full series, producer Sherwood Schwartz reworked the basic premise for the short-lived 1980s sitcom Together We Stand starring Elliott Gould and Dee Wallace.

The Brady Kids

A 22-episode animated Saturday morning cartoon series, produced by Filmation and airing on ABC from September 1972 to August 1974, is about the Brady kids having various adventures. The family's adults were never seen or mentioned, and the "home" scenes were in a very large, well-appointed tree house. Several animals were regular characters, including two non-English-speaking pandas (Ping and Pong), a talking bird (Merlin) which could do magic, and an ordinary pet dog (Mop Top). The first 17 episodes featured the voices of all six of the original child actors from the show, but Barry Williams, Maureen McCormick, and Christopher Knight were replaced for the last five episodes due to a contract dispute.

The Brady Bunch Variety Hour

On November 28, 1976, a one-hour television special entitled The Brady Bunch Variety Hour aired on ABC. Eve Plumb was the only regular cast member from the original show who declined to be in the series and the role of Jan was recast with Geri Reischl. Produced by Sid and Marty Krofft, the sibling team behind H.R. Pufnstuf, Donny and Marie, and other variety shows and children's series of the era, the show was intended to air every fifth week in the same slot as The Hardy Boys/Nancy Drew Mysteries, but ended up being scheduled sporadically throughout the season, leading to inconsistent ratings and its inevitable cancellation.

In 2009, Brady Bunch cast member Susan Olsen, with Lisa Sutton, published a book, Love to Love You Bradys, which dissects and celebrates the Variety Hour as a cult classic.

The Brady Girls Get Married / The Brady Brides

A TV reunion movie called The Brady Girls Get Married was produced in 1981. Although scheduled to be shown in its original full-length movie format, NBC decided at the last minute to divide it into half-hour segments and show one part a week for three weeks. The fourth week debuted a spin-off sitcom titled The Brady Brides, which carried on from where the reunion movie left off. The movie featured the entire original cast; this proved to be the only time the entire cast worked together on a single project following the cancellation of the original series (the complete surviving cast also appeared in these official projects together: Brady Bunch Home Movies from 1995, The Brady Bunch 35th Anniversary Reunion Special: Still Brady After All These Years from 2004, as well as various reunion programs in 2019 for the 50th anniversary). The movie's opening credits featured the season-one "Grid" and theme song, with the addition of The Brady Girls Get Married title. The movie shows what the characters had been doing since the original series ended: Mike is still an architect, Carol is a real-estate agent, Greg is a doctor, Marcia is a fashion designer, Peter is in the Air Force, Jan is also an architect, Bobby and Cindy are in college, and Alice has married Sam. Eventually, they all reunite for Marcia and Jan's double wedding.

The Brady Brides features Maureen McCormick and Eve Plumb reprising their respective roles as Marcia and Jan Brady. The series begins with Marcia and Jan and their new husbands buying a house and living together. The clashes between Jan's uptight and conservative husband, Philip Covington III (a college professor in science who is several years older than Jan, played by Ron Kuhlman) and Marcia's slovenly and more bohemian husband, Wally Logan (a fun-loving salesman for a large toy company, played by Jerry Houser), were the pivot on which many of the stories were based, not unlike The Odd Couple. Florence Henderson and Ann B. Davis also appeared regularly. Ten episodes were aired before the sitcom was cancelled. This was the only Brady show in sitcom form to be filmed in front of a live studio audience. Bob Eubanks guest-starred as himself in an episode where the two couples appear on The Newlywed Game.

Throughout the late 1980s and 1990s, The Brady Girls Get Married was rerun on various networks in its original full-length movie format.

In 2019, the series was released on DVD for the first time as a part of The Brady-est Brady Bunch TV & Movie Collection.

Episodes (1981)

A Very Brady Christmas

A second TV reunion movie, A Very Brady Christmas, aired in December 1988 on CBS and features most of the regular cast (except Susan Olsen, who was on her honeymoon at the time of filming; the role of Cindy was played by Jennifer Runyon), as well as three grandchildren, Peter's girlfriend, Valerie, and the spouses of Greg, Marcia, and Jan (Nora, Wally, and Phillip, respectively). The Nielsen ratings for A Very Brady Christmas were the highest of any television movie that season for CBS.

The Bradys

Due to the success of A Very Brady Christmas, CBS asked Brady Bunch creator Sherwood Schwartz and son Lloyd to create a new series for the network. According to Lloyd Schwartz, he and his father initially balked at the idea because they felt a new series would harm the Brady franchise. They finally relented because CBS was "desperate for programming". A new series featuring the Brady clan was created entitled The Bradys. All original Brady Bunch cast members returned for the series, except for Maureen McCormick (Marcia), who was replaced with Leah Ayres.

As with A Very Brady Christmas, The Bradys also balanced elements of comedy and drama and featured storylines of a more serious nature than the original series and subsequent spin-offs. Lloyd Schwartz later said he compared The Bradys to another dramedy of the time, thirtysomething. The two-hour series premiere episode aired on February 9, 1990, at 9 pm on CBS and initially drew respectable ratings. Subsequent episodes were moved to 8 pm, where ratings quickly declined. Due to the decline, CBS cancelled the series after six episodes.

Day by Day: "A Very Brady Episode"
The Day by Day episode titled "A Very Brady Episode" (February 5, 1989), on NBC, reunited six of the original Brady Bunch cast members: Robert Reed, Florence Henderson, Ann B. Davis, Christopher Knight, Mike Lookinland and Maureen McCormick.

Bradymania: A Very Brady Special
A one-hour TV special retrospective of The Brady Bunch hosted by Florence Henderson who introduces a montage of various episodes of the original series, and also examines the show's phenomenal after-life, illustrated by clips from spin-offs and other incarnations of the series. Also, cast members Christopher Knight, Susan Olsen, Mike Lookinland, Barry Williams, Ann B. Davis, and creator Sherwood Schwartz reflect on the impact of the show on their lives. Directed by Malcolm Leo, the special was originally broadcast on ABC on May 19, 1993.

A Very Brady Renovation

Christopher Knight, Mike Lookinland, Maureen McCormick, Susan Olsen, Eve Plumb, and Barry Williams reunited for the 2019 HGTV series A Very Brady Renovation, which follows a full renovation (interior mostly) of the real house, used for the sitcom's exterior shots, into the fictional Brady house.

Chopped
In conjunction with the Renovation series, in the autumn of 2019, The Food Network aired two episodes of their program Chopped with the siblings as guest judges. Season 43, episode 3 - "Brady Bunch Bash" features Williams, Plumb, and Lookinland judging meals made from Hawaiian ingredients. Season 43, episode 4 - "A Very Brady Chopped" features McCormick, Knight, and Olsen judging meals from "groovy" ingredients of the '70s.

A Very Brady Musical
In October 2020, Ogunquit Playhouse did a live stream broadcast of A Very Brady Musical, a brand new musical adventure for the stage created by Lloyd J. Schwartz (son of Brady Bunch creator Sherwood Schwartz), Hope Juber (book/lyrics), and Laurence Juber (music/lyrics) and directed by Richard Israel. It was co-produced by Ogunquit Playhouse, Purple Mountain Productions, and Broadway and Beyond Theatricals. More in the vein of the Brady films, this PG-13 story follows the Brady kids’ misadventures when they come to the mistaken conclusion that Mike and Carol are headed for divorce. After consulting Alice, the kids raise money to pay for marriage counseling, learning valuable lessons along the way, as their respective well-intentioned ideas land them in outrageous trouble. Barry Williams and Christopher Knight were on hand for a post-show question and answer session on all things Brady.

Dragging the Classics: The Brady Bunch
On June 30, 2021, streaming service Paramount+ celebrated Pride Month with the premiere of a crossover special combining The Brady Bunch and popular reality television series RuPaul's Drag Race. In the crossover event, original Brady cast members and former Drag Race competitors come together to recreate a Brady Bunch episode. Christopher Knight and Mike Lookinland reprise their roles of Peter and Bobby Brady, respectively, while the original Greg Brady, Barry Williams, switches parts to play family patriarch Mike; Greg Brady is portrayed by Drag Race Season 6 and Allstars 3 competitor BenDeLaCreme. Season 6 winner Bianca Del Rio fills the role of mother Carol Brady, and daughters Marcia, Jan, and Cindy are portrayed by Allstars 5 winner Shea Couleé, season 2 and Allstars 6 competitor Kylie Sonique Love, and season 13 runner-up Kandy Muse, respectively. Season 11 Miss Congeniality Nina West appears as housekeeper Alice Nelson.

The special, which recreates the season two episode "Will the Real Jan Brady Please Stand Up?", also contains cameos by Drag Race judges RuPaul and Michelle Visage, who appear as employees of a wig shop that Jan patronizes. The original Jan and Cindy Brady, Eve Plumb and Susan Olsen, also appear as children who are guests at the birthday party.

The Real Brady Bros: Podcast
In January 2022, Christopher Knight and Barry Williams published their new podcast The Real Brady Bros. The weekly podcast recaps episodes of The Brady Bunch. Eve Plumb, Susan Olsen and Mike Lookinland have guested to discuss episodes in which they have featured.

Film adaptations
Twenty years following the conclusion of the original series, a film adaptation, The Brady Bunch Movie, went into production and was released in 1995 from Paramount Pictures. The film is set in the present day (1990s) and the Bradys, still living their lives as if it were the 1970s, are unfamiliar with their surroundings. It stars Gary Cole and Shelley Long as Mike and Carol Brady, with Christopher Daniel Barnes (Greg), Christine Taylor (Marcia), Paul Sutera (Peter), Jennifer Elise Cox (Jan), Jesse Lee (Bobby), Olivia Hack (Cindy), Henriette Mantel (Alice), and cameo appearances from Ann B. Davis as a long-haul truck driver, Barry Williams as a record label executive, Christopher Knight as a Westdale High gym teacher, Rupaul as a guidance counselor, and Florence Henderson as Carol's mother. Mike Lookinland, Susan Olsen and Maureen McCormick appear in deleted scenes.

A sequel, A Very Brady Sequel, was released in 1996. The cast of the first film returned for the sequel. Another sequel, The Brady Bunch in the White House, was made-for-television and aired on Fox in 2002. Gary Cole and Shelley Long returned for the third film, while the Brady kids and Alice were recast.

The third episode of the Disney+ miniseries WandaVision, "Now in Color", pays homage to 1970s sitcoms, including The Brady Bunch, and uses a similar intro for the virtual WandaVision in-show program.

See also

 It's a Sunshine Day: The Best of The Brady Bunch
 Tam Spiva, a Brady Bunch script writer
 Christmas with The Brady Bunch, an album released by Paramount Records in 1970

References

External links

 
 
 "The Brady Bunch Cast: Where are they now?" - ABC News, 2010 (includes some editorial errors)
 
  - The Real Brady Bros Podcast

 
1969 American television series debuts
1974 American television series endings
1960s American sitcoms
1970s American sitcoms

American Broadcasting Company original programming
English-language television shows
Single-camera television sitcoms
Television shows adapted into films
Television series about children
Television series about fictional musicians
Television series about families
Television series created by Sherwood Schwartz
Television series by CBS Studios
Television shows set in Los Angeles
Television series about siblings